Vietnam Aviation Academy (abbreviated VAA) is a Vietnamese university focusing on aviation-related courses. The university is operated by the Ministry of Transport.

The academy has two campuses in Ho Chi Minh City: one in Tân Bình District and one in Phú Nhuận District. It also has a campus in Cam Ranh, Khánh Hòa Province. It offers bachelor's degrees in business administration, electronics and telecommunications engineering, and air traffic management.

Faculties
 Faculty of Foundation Studies
 Faculty of Airport
 Faculty of Air Traffic
 Faculty of Air Transport
 Faculty of Aeronautical Electronics – Telecommunications Engineering
 Faculty of Complementary Staff-training and International Cooperation

Centers
 Center for Foreign Language and Informatics
 Center for Aviation Professional Training
 Center for Aviator Training

External links
VAA Official Website (in Vietnamese)

Government of Vietnam
Universities in Ho Chi Minh City